Gaviota Peak is a summit in the Santa Ynez Mountains in Santa Barbara County, California.

Gaviota Grade is the most formidable in length and elevation change along U.S. Route 101 in Southern California.

Background
The Gaviota Peak Fire Road trail starts near the junction of U.S. Route 101 and California State Route 1, in Gaviota State Park, and ends on the summit in the Los Padres National Forest. The trail passes Gaviota Hot Springs, and offers views of the Santa Ynez Mountains, Lompoc Valley, the Pacific Ocean and the Channel Islands.

See also 
 Gaviota Tunnel
 Gaviota, California

References

External links 
 

Los Padres National Forest
Santa Barbara Ranger District, Los Padres National Forest
Mountains of Santa Barbara County, California
Mountains of Southern California